Boatswain is the seniormost rate of the deck department.

Boatswain or bosun may also refer to:

Occupations 
Boatswain's mate (United States Navy), a job classification in the United States Navy
Boatswain's mate (United States Coast Guard), a job classification in the United States Coast Guard
Boatswain, a position on yacht racing crews
Boatswain, the highest petty officer in Sea Scouting

Animals 
Boatswain (bird), any species of gull of the genus Stercorarius
Boatswain Bird Island, a small uninhabited island and nature reserve home to many endemic species of bird off the coast of Ascension Island

Equipment 
 Bosun, the NATO reporting name for the Soviet Tupolev Tu-14 bomber
 Bosun (dinghy), a type of sailing dinghy
 Bosun's chair, a type of harness that allows a crewmember to climb into the rigging and work safely on the sails, halyards, or other rigging
 Boatswain's call, a pipe or whistle used to issue commands on board ship

The arts 
 The Boatswain, a minor character in Shakespeare's The Tempest
 Boatswain, a Newfoundland dog kept by Lord Byron, who honored him by the poem "Epitaph to a Dog"

Surname 
Jacqueline Boatswain (born 1962), English actress
Quinton Boatswain (born 1990), Montserratian cricketer